The Face Thailand Season 4 (also known as The Face Thailand All Stars) On 30 September 2017 at The Face Men Thailand season 1's final walk the executive producer announced on stage that he will premiere The Face Thailand All Stars. Feature returning non-winning contestants from 3 previous seasons of The Face Thailand and The Face Men Thailand (season 1) for a second chance to win the title. The season  premiered on 10 February 2018.

Mentors

 Lukkade Metinee
 Bee Namthip
 Cris Horwang
 Ploy Chermarn  (ep. 1–12)
 Sonia Couling
 Sririta Jensen

Contestants
(ages stated are at start of filming)
{| class="wikitable sortable" style="font-size:91%; text-align:center"
|-
! Contestant
! Age
! Height
! Hometown
! Previous  Season
! Previous  Model Coach
! Previous  Place
! Model Coach
! Finish
! Place
|-
| Jutiporn "Maprang" Arunchot
| 23
| 
| Chiang Mai
| Season 2
| Lukkade
| 4
| Bee and Rita
| Episode 2
| 18
|-
| Salita "Jukkoo" Klinchan
| 24
| 
| Samut Sakhon
| Season 2
| Bee
| 7-5
| Ploy and Sonia
| Episode 3
| 17
|-
| Kirana "Jazzy" Jasmine Chewter
| 19
| 
| Bangkok
| Season 2
| Cris
| 8
| Bee and Rita
| Episode 5
| 16
|-
| Nathachat "Hana" Chancheaw
| 26
| 
| Surin
| Season 3
| Lukkade and Cris
| 9
| Ploy and Sonia
| Episode 6
| 15
|-
| Aornicha "Jenny" Akrasaevaya
| 24
| 
| Khon Kaen
| Season 1
| Ploy
| 13
| Bee and Rita
| Episode 7
| 14
|-
| Kansiri "Hong" Sirimat
| 23
| 
| Bangkok
| Season 1
| Ying
| 9
| Lukkade and Cris
| Episode 8
| 13
|-
| Tanaphop "Third" Yoovichit
| 20
| 
| Bangkok
| Season 1 (Men)
| Moo
| 5-4
| Lukkade and Cris
| rowspan="5" |Episode 12
| 12
|-
| Peemsinee "Fah" Sawangkla
| 24
| 
| Nonthaburi
| Season 3
| Lukkade
| 4-2
| Ploy and Sonia
| 11
|-
| Niki Boontham
| 22
| 
| Chonburi
| Season 1 (Men)
| Lukkade
| 14-12
| Lukkade and Cris
| rowspan="3" | 10-8
|-
| Raknapak "Namwan" Wongtanatat
| 28
| 
| Bangkok
| Season 2
| Cris
| 14
| Lukkade and Cris|-
| Jittima "Sai" Visuttipranee
| 27
| 
| Chiang Mai
| Season 1
| Ying| 4
| Ploy and Sonia|-
| Joseph Angelo
| 24
| 
| Khon Kaen
| Season 1 (Men)
| Peach| 5-4
| Bee and Rita| rowspan="7" |
| rowspan="6" |7-2
|-
| Tia Li Taveepanichpan
| 21
| 
| Phuket
| Season 3
| Bee| 7-5
| Bee and Rita|-
| Maria "Sky" Hoerschler
| 23
| 
| Ubon Ratchathani
| Season 3
| Bee| 4-2
| Bee and Rita|-
| 
| 23
| 
| Chonburi
| Season 3
| Marsha and Cris| 8
| Lukkade and Cris|-
| Korawan "Prim" Lodsantia
| 22
| 
| Nakhon Ratchasima
| Season 3
| Marsha| 12
| Ploy and Sonia|-
| Arthur "Attila" Apichaht Gagnaux
| 25
| 
| 
| 
| Moo| 3-2
| Ploy and Sonia|-
| Virahya "Gina" Pattarachokchai
| 25
| 
| Ratchaburi
| Season 2
| Lukkade| 3-2
| Lukkade and Cris|1
|}

Episodes

Episode 1 : Casting
First air 10 February 2018

 Team Lukkade and Cris : Gina, Niki, Hong, Namwan, Third, Darran.
 Team Bee and Rita : Jenny, Tia, Joseph Angelo, Jazzy, Sky, Maprang.
 Team Ploy and Sonia : Attila, Prim, Sai, Fah, Jukkoo, Hana.
 Special guest: Piyarat Kaljaruek

Episode 2 : The Godness of Nature and Fire
First airdate: 17 February 2018

 Winning coach and team:  Sonia Couling Bottom two: Niki Boontham & Maprang Arunchot
 Eliminated: Maprang Arunchot
 Special guest: Sombatsara Thirasaroj & Cindy Bishop

Episode 3 : Outstanding
First airdate: 24 February 2018

 Winning coach and team:  Sririta Jensen Bottom two: Third Yoovichit & Jukkoo Klinchan
 Eliminated: Jukkoo Klinchan
 Special guest: Araya Indra, Pangina Heals, Pattriya Na Nakorn, Nutthanaphol Thinroj & Drag Race Thailand
 Featured photographer: Punsiri Siriwetchapun

Episode 4 : The Couture Musketeers
First airdate: 3 March 2018

 Winning coach and team: Cris Horwang Bottom two: Jenny Akrasaevaya & Hana Chancheaw
 Eliminated: None
 Special guest: Kulp Kaljareuk, Rattanarat Eertaweekul, Sansern Ngernrungruangroj & Rhatha Phongam

Episode 5 : Brightness
First airdate: 17 March 2018

 Winning coach and team:  Sonia Couling Bottom two: Hong Sirimat & Jazzy Chewter
 Eliminated:  Jazzy Chewter
 Special guest: Techin Ploypetch, Natapohn Tameeruks, Nattavut Trivisvavet & Sakuntala Thianphairot
 Featured photographer: Nat Prakobsantisuk

Episode 6 : Under Water World
First airdate: 24 March 2018

 Winning coach and team:  Sririta Jensen Bottom two: Niki Boontham & Hana Chancheaw
 Eliminated: Hana Chancheaw
 Special mentor: Ajirapha Meisinger & Natthaya Boonchompaisarn
 Special guest: Wilasinee Panurat & Kanticha Chumma

Episode 7 : Always Get More Is ME
First airdate: 31 March 2018

 Winning coach and team:  Cris Horwang Bottom two: Jenny Akrasaevaya & Sai Visuttipranee
 Eliminated: Jenny Akrasaevaya
 Special guest: Cindy Bishop

Episode 8 : Looking Grace Swing
First airdate: 7 April 2018

 Winning coach and team: Bee Namthip 
 Bottom two: Hong Sirimaat & Sai Visuttipranee
 Eliminated: Hong Sirimaat
 Special guest: Polpat Asavaprapha & Aniporn Chalermburanawong

Episode 9 : SHU Everyday Lifestyle Fashion
First airdate: 14 April 2018

 Winning coach and team: Ploy Chermarn 
 Bottom two: Third Yuvijit & Joseph Angelo
 Eliminated:  Third Yuvijit & Joseph Angelo (Both Eliminated)
 Special guest: Marsha Vadhanapanich

Episode 10 : Everyday is Runway
First airdate: 21 April 2018

 Winning coach and team: Sririta Jensen Bottom two: Fah Sawangkla & Namwan Wongtanatat
 Eliminated: None
 Special guest: Polpat Asavaprapha

Episode 11 : CHR Irresistible
First airdate: 28 April 2018

 Winning coach and team:  Sririta Jensen Bottom two: Fah Sawangkla & Niki Boontham
 Eliminated: Fah Sawangkla
 Special guest: Ratchawin Wongviriya

Episode 12 : Atomic Blonde
First airdate: 6 May 2018

 Winning coach and team: Bee Namthip and Sririta Jensen Winning campaign: Tia Taveepanichpan
 Returned: Fah Sawangkla, Third Yuvijit and Joseph Angelo
 Final sixth was chosen by Coach: Gina Pattarachokchai, Darran Chanavarasutthisiri, Prim Lodsantia, Attila Gagnaux, Tia Taveepanichpan and Sky Hoerschler
 Seventh final was chosen by coach from winning campaign team: Joseph Angelo
 Eliminated: Sai Visuttipranee, Namwan Wongtanatat, Niki Boontham, Fah Sawangkla and Third Yuvijit
 Special guest: Urassaya Sperbund

Episode 13 : Final Walk
First airdate: 12 May 2018Final 7: Gina Pattarachokchai, Darran Chanavarasutthisiri, Prim Lodsantia, Attila Gagnaux, Tia Taveepanichpan and Sky Hoerschler, Joseph AngeloWinning campaign: Gina PattarachokchaiWinning special award: Joseph AngeloThe Face Thailand: Gina PattarachokchaiWinning coach and team: Lukkade Metinee & Cris Horwang'Summaries

 Elimination Table 

 The contestant was part of the winning team for the episode.
 The contestant was part of the winning special award from the campaign for the episode.
 The contestant was at risk of elimination.
 The contestant was eliminated from the competition.
 The contestant was immune from elimination.
 The contestant was immune from elimination but was eliminated.
 The contestant was originally eliminated but returned to the competition.
 The contestant was originally eliminated but returned to the competition and was eliminated.
 The contestant was a Runner-Up.
 The contestant won The Face Thailand.

 Episode 1 was the casting episode. The final eighteen were divided into individual teams of six as they were selected.
 From episodes 2-11, challenge winner each episode was also immune from nomination/elimination if they happened to be on one of the losing teams.
 In episode 4, team Cris & Lukkade won the campaign. Sonia nominated Hana while Bee nominated Jenny for the elimination. Cris did not eliminate either of them.
 In episode 9, Joseph won challenge winner but he disclaim his immune and went to elimination room together with Third. Ploy eliminated both of them.
 In episode 10, team Bee & Rita won the campaign. Cris nominated Namwan while Ploy nominated Fah for elimination. Rita did not eliminate either of them.

Campaigns
 Episode 1: Runway and Self Administered 'Transformations' (Casting)
 Episode 2: The Godness of Nature and Fire
 Episode 3: Outstanding
 Episode 4: The Couture Musketeers
 Episode 5: Brightness
 Episode 6: Under Water World
 Episode 7: Always Get More Is ME
 Episode 8: Looking Grace Swing
 Episode 9: SHU Everyday Lifestyle Fashion
 Episode 10: Everyday is Runway
 Episode 11: CHR Irresistible
 Episode 12: Atomic Blonde
 Episode 13: Acting TVC Sea Min Drink and Final walk

Notes

 [c] Previously known in Season 1 is Aornicha "Jenny" Kaykham.
 [b] Previously known in Season 3 is Wilawan "Julie" Anderson.
 [c] Fah represented Thailand at the 2018 Asia Model Festival Awards (Face of Asia)'' held in South Korea, were she winning Seoul Representative Model and Lui & Lei Cosmetics Awards.

References

Thailand, 4
The Face Thailand seasons
2018 Thai television seasons